"Old MacDonald Had a Farm" is a science fiction short story by American writer Mike Resnick, published in 2001.

The story is about a reporter who visits a farm where millions of genetically engineered animals are raised to help alleviate the world's food shortage. What he finds there is both brilliantly wonderful and tragically disturbing.

"Old MacDonald Had a Farm" was finalist for the 2002 Hugo Award for Best Short Story.

References

External links 
 

2002 short stories
Genetically modified organisms in agriculture
Short stories by Mike Resnick
Works originally published in Asimov's Science Fiction
English-language works
American short stories